The 2012 Four Nations Tournament was the eleventh edition of the Four Nations Tournament, an invitational women's football tournament held in China.

Participants

Venues

Final standings

Match results

References 

2012 in women's association football
2012
2012 in Chinese football
2012 in North Korean football
2011–12 in Mexican football
2012 in South Korean football
February 2012 sports events in Asia
2012 in Chinese women's sport